Shri Shivaji Institute of Engineering and Management Studies at Parbhnani (SSIEMS) is an engineering college in Akola district in Maharashtra, India. The college is located in the heart of the city on Vasmat road Highway (NH-22) in Parbhani. 

SSIEMS established in 2010, is a private engineering institute run by the Shri Shivaji Education Society granting Bachelor of Engineering (BE) degrees in Civil, Mechanical, Electrical & Electronics, and Computer Science.  It is affiliated with BATU Lonere.

External links 
Shivaji Engineering College (COETA), Akola.

Engineering colleges in Maharashtra
Sant_Gadge_Baba_Amravati_University
Education in Akola
Monuments and memorials to Shivaji
Educational institutions established in 1983
1983 establishments in Maharashtra